KTOH (99.9 FM) is a radio station licensed to Kalaheo, Hawaii. Owned by H Hawaii Media, it broadcasts a country music format serving Kauaʻi.

History
The station was assigned the call sign KAYI on November 10, 1997. On November 7, 2000, the station changed its call sign to the current KTOH.

HD Radio 
The station operates two HD Radio subchannels, classic hits Sunny 101.3, and active rock 107.9 The X. Both channels' present formats launched in February 2023 to replace oldies and Hawaiian music/tourist information formats respectively. Both stations are simulcast in analog on the low-power translators 101.3 FM/Kapaa and 107.9 FM/Kalaheo respectively.

References

External links

TOH
Country radio stations in the United States
Radio stations established in 1997
1997 establishments in Hawaii